Brevibacterium hankyongi is a Gram-positive, rod-shaped, strictly aerobic and non-motil bacterium from the genus of Brevibacterium which has been isolated from compost.

References

Micrococcales
Bacteria described in 2018